Grupo Candeias de Capoeira is an international Capoeira group, has its headquarters located in Goiânia, Goiás, Brazil and is presided over by the Mestre Suíno.

History 

Grupo Candeias was founded at the SESC Club in the university sector in 1977 in Goiânia, Goias, Brazil.

In that time the group was called Grupo de Capoeira Anglo Regional and the first groups teacher was Carlos Antonio (Carlinhos Chuchu). In the year 1978 Mestre Passarinho took on the group changing the name to Grupo de Capoeira São Bento Pequeno. Two years later, he decided to leave the SESC in Goiânia bringing Grupo São Bento Pequeno and part of the student body with him, in the same year Mestre Suíno took on the group that was left, using the name Grupo de Capoeira Anglo Regional temporarily until he could create a new name for the group.

The group grew very fast, and some of the teachers were founding other groups of their own, and due to this the Anglo Regional became an association with a high number of followers and because of that there were a lot of "problems" going on, and questions about how to get all the groups together as one.

Then in 1991 they had a contest to change the name of the group, so all of them could follow the same graduation system, same philosophy and most importantly the same name. Since 1992 all of them started to use only one name, Grupo Candeias de Capoeira.

Grupo Candeias is considered one of the most expressive groups of capoeira with over ten thousand students. Nowadays you can find Grupo Candeias in most of Brazil, USA, Chile, Peru, Ecuador, Argentina, France, Spain, United Kingdom, France, Portugal, Italy, Bolivia, Colombia, the Czech Republic, Germany, Belgium and Ireland. 

The current challenge of the Candeias Group is to grow always contemporary, without losing identity.

The President of the Group is Mr. Elto Pereira de Brito, Master Suíno, who runs it together with the Board of Masters.

Mestres 
Currently, the Candeias Group of Capoeira has 18 masters:
 Mestre Suíno
 Mestre Sarará
 Mestre Piau
 Mestre Cabeça
 Mestre Xoroquinho
 Mestre Xeréu
 Mestre Babuíno
 Mestre Tiziu
 Mestre Tourinho
 Mestre Soneca
 Mestre Gueroba
 Mestre Senzala
 Mestre Lula
 Mestre Santiago
 Mestre Iúna
 Mestre Besouro
 Mestre Saci
 Mestre Fiapo
 Mestre Saúva
 Mestre Mola
 Mestre Sazuki

External links 
Grupo Candeias Website
Grupo Candeias - Seattle, Washington - USA
Grupo Candeias - Arlington, Texas - USA
Grupo Candeias - Passau - Germany
Grupo Candeias in Ireland
Grupo Candeias - Peru
Grupo Candeias - Basque Country - Spain
Grupo Candeias - Prague - the Czech Republic
Grupo Candeias - Pays Basque - France
Grupo Candeias - Rosario - Argentina
Grupo Candeias - Joinville-SC-Brasil
Grupo Candeias - Cuiabá-MT-Brasil
Grupo Candeias - Itapevi-SP - Brasil

Capoeira